The 2020 Missouri State Treasurer election was held on November 3, 2020 to elect the State Treasurer of the U.S. state of Missouri. Elections were also held for U.S. president, U.S. House, and Governor of Missouri, as well as various state and local elections.

Incumbent Republican Scott Fitzpatrick was appointed by Governor Mike Parson to finish the term of previous Treasurer Eric Schmitt, who had been subsequently appointed as Attorney General. In 2016, Schmitt was elected with 56.5% of the vote, gaining control of a previously Democratic controlled office.

Republican primary

Candidates

Declared
 Scott Fitzpatrick, incumbent Treasurer of Missouri

Results

Democratic primary

Candidates

Declared
 Vicki Englund, former state representative

Results

Third parties

Green Party

Candidates

Declared
Joseph Civettini

Results

Libertarian Party

Candidates

Declared
Nick Kasoff

Results

General election

Polling

Results

Notes

See also
 2020 Missouri gubernatorial election

References

State Treasurer
Missouri state treasurer elections
Missouri